Chutney music is a fusion genre of Indian folk music, specifically Bhojpuri folk music, with local Caribbean calypso and soca music, and later on Bollywood music. This genre of music that developed in Trinidad and Tobago is popular in Trinidad and Tobago, Guyana, Suriname, Jamaica, other parts of the Caribbean, Fiji, Mauritius, and South Africa. Chutney music emerged mid-20th century and reached a peak of popularity during the 1980s. Several sub-genres have developed.

History
This contemporary fusion of genres was created by Indo-Caribbean people whose ancestors were from the Hindi Belt. They were taken as indentured laborers by the British to replace slave laborers on sugar plantations after emancipation. Chutney music was established in the 1940s within temples, wedding houses, and cane fields of the Indo-Caribbean. There were no recordings until 1968, when Ramdew Chaitoe of Suriname, a small country in South America, recorded an early rendition of chutney music. The album was entitled King of Suriname and all of the songs were religious in nature. However, Chaitoe soon became a household name with East Indians not just in Suriname but throughout the Caribbean.  Although the songs were religious, they had a dance vibe throughout each track. For the first time Indo-Caribbeans had music that spoke to them and was not specifically Indian or European/American in style. This was a breakthrough for East Indian Caribbean music, but the fame was short lived.

Chutney music exploded again in 1968 with the female singer Dropati, who released an album entitled Let's Sing & Dance, made up of traditional wedding songs. These songs became huge hits within the Indo-Caribbean community. The album gained recognition for chutney music as a legitimate form and united Indians, regardless of their birthplace.

1969 was a turning point for chutney music when record producer Moean Mohammed recorded Sundar Popo with Harry Mahabir's BWIA Orchestra. Sundar Popo modernized the music by including western guitars and early electronics into his music. Although Popo became known as the "King of Chutney," the art of singing songs in "Chutney" style was introduced by a singer named Lakhan Kariya, from the town of Felicity, Chaguanas who preceded Sundar Popo. Other artists, such as Sam Boodram, followed in his footsteps by adding new modern instrumentation into their music. Chutney music until then remained a local music in Trinidad and Tobago, Guyana, and Suriname.

After the success of Kuchh Gadbad Hai, other Chutney artists began to fuse calypso, soca and American rhythm and blues, naming their music Indian soca. A young female artist named Drupatee Ramgoonai from Trinidad emerged on this new scene. At first she was criticized for being "dutty" (rude or crude in creole), because she wrote about sex and alcohol. This was nothing new, as she was following in the footsteps of other calypsonians who they sing about issues in their life or what is happening within the community. Drupatee was later given the title "Queen of Chutney." By the end of the 1980s chutney music was introduced in Indian films.

During the 1990s many mom and pop recording companies mushroomed and set out to cash in on the Chutney craze. Companies in The United States and Canada began to pick up chutney artists for their recording companies. These included the successful Jamaican Me Crazy (JMC) Records, Spice Island Records, Mohabir Records and JTS Productions. The establishment of nightclubs such as Soca Paradise and Calypso City in New York and Connections and Calypso Hut in Toronto, coupled with these new recording companies were all factors instrumental in promoting Indo-Caribbean music overseas and in the West Indies.

Musical style

The modern chutney artist writes lyrics in either Caribbean Hindustani or English, then lays them over beats derived from Indian dholak beats mixed with the soca beat.

Chutney is an uptempo song, accompanied by bass guitar, drum machine, electric guitar, synthesizer, dholak, harmonium, and dhantal, tassa played in rhythms imported from filmi, calypso or soca. Early chutney was religious in nature sung by mainly women in Trinidad & Tobago. Chutney is unusual in the predominance of female musicians in its early years, although it has since become more gender-mixed.

Chutney artists include Sundar Popo, Sonny Mann, Lakhan Kariya, Sam Boodram, Boodram Holass, Rikki Jai, Raymond Ramnarine, Rakesh Yankaran, Anand Yankaran, Devanand Gattoo, Ravi Bissambhar, Rasika Dindial, Hemlata Dindial, Heeralal Rampartap, and Ramdew Chaitoe, who composed the Surinamese-based "Baithak Gana" in his album The Star Melodies of Ramdew Chaitoe.  Among the best known examples of chutney music are Sundar Popo's "Pholourie Bina Chutney" or Sundar Popo's first recorded song "Nani And Nana", Sam Boodram's " Lalana Khoose" Sonny Mann's "Lotalal", Vedesh Sookoo's "Dhal Belly Indian", Anand Yankaran's "Jo Jo", Neeshan "D Hitman" Prabhoo's "Mr. Shankar", Ravi B's "Rum Is Meh Lova" and Rikki Jai's "Mor Tor", KI's "Single Forever", Princess Anisa's "Tek Sunita (Nadia's Reply)", and Vanita Willie's "Poowah".

The nature of current chutney songs are simple. They speak about life and love for many things, whether for a significant other or for an object of possession. Some chutney songs favor the topic of food or drink; however, like most West Indian music, there can be a hidden message found in the song if you read between the lines.

Instrumentation
Chutney music is typically played with the dholak, dhantal and harmonium.  The melody of the music is provided by the harmonium, and the dholak and dhantal for the rhythm. More modernly, drum machines playing tassa have been incorporated into chutney as well. Tassa is drumming used in the Muslim Hosay festival, and is also played during Hindu weddings and other celebrations.

Languages
Chutney music is sung in Caribbean English, Caribbean Hindustani (a form of the Bhojpuri and Awadhi dialect of Hindustani), and sometimes other Indian languages. Although chutney music has Hindustani words it has been deemed ownership by the local Indians and belongs to the Caribbean, it has not been recognized in the Indian music or film industry, it is of Indo-Caribbean culture. Traditionally speaking, the lyrics of chutney are from folk, classical, and religious music, but that has changed over the years. In modern chutney music, including the newer subgenres, the lyrics have evolved to be more contemporary and include more English.

Subgenres
The origin of chutney being in the Caribbean has meant that it's been in close contact with different peoples, traditions, and other musical styles since its inception. According to the government of Trinidad and Tobago, roughly 35% of the country's population is of Indian descent, another 34% of African descent, and the remaining 31% composed of a mix of European, Chinese, Middle Eastern, and other ancestry. This has allowed chutney to fuse with other genres and/or to implement new instruments into its own style, creating an array of syncretic subgenres including ragga chutney, chutney-bhangra, chutney hip-hop, soca-bhangra,  and chutney soca.

Chutney soca is the most notable of these, as it has become virtually indistinguishable from what is considered normal chutney in recent years. Drupatee Ramgoonai coined the term with the release of her album, "Chatnee Soca," in 1987. The style had an emphasis on Hindi lyrics and the beats of the dholak and dhantal. It was further popularized by the 1994 album, "Soca Chutney," by Sonny Mann. It was credited as the best selling Indo-Caribbean album ever, with its title track hitting the top of charts not only in the Caribbean, but in the United States, Canada, and England.

Modern chutney soca, like many chutney subgenres, has incorporated more use of keyboards, drum machines, and other electronic instruments.

References

General references
 Broughton, Simon, and Mark Ellingham. "Trinidad: Chutney." World music: the Rough guide : [an A-Z of the music, musicians and discs.. London: The Rough Guides, 2000. 527-530. Print.
 Ingram, Amelia. "What is Chutney Music?." An Exploration of Music and Culture in Trinidad. N.p., n.d. Web. 3 May 2011. Wesleyan University
 Manuel, Peter, Kenneth M. Bilby, and Michael D. Largey. Caribbean currents: Caribbean music from rumba to reggae. Philadelphia: Temple University Press, 1995. Print.
 Manuel, Peter. "Chutney and Indo-Trinidadian cultural identity." Popular Music 17 (1998): 21-43. Print.
 Ramnarine, Tina Karina. ""Indian" Music in the Diaspora: Case Studies of "Chutney" in Trinidad and in London." British Journal of Ethnomusicology 5 (1996): 133-153. Print.  subscription-only link from JSTOR
Poppelwell, Georgia. "The Chutney Phenomenon." Caribbean Beat Magazine. (1996)
Sriskandarajah, Ike. Indian Folk Music Brought To Trinidad Looks For Fans Outside The Caribbean. NPR. (2015).

Chutney music
Trinidad and Tobago styles of music
Guyanese music
Indo-Caribbean culture
Folk music genres